Cholo is a Peruvian film from 1972 directed by Bernardo Batievsky that tells the story of the Peruvian soccer player Hugo Sotil.

Synopsis  
A young provincial painter migrates to Lima, where he finds a hostile and racist city. His soccer ability makes him reach sporting fame by traveling to several European countries.

Production 
After surviving a heart attack in the early 1970s, Batievsky began writing and later directing a film about soccer starring the successful soccer player Hugo Sotil. The film was released on May 18, 1972 in fifteen theaters in Lima. A week after its release, the director had the film removed from the billboard after receiving negative reviews.

The music was in charge of the Peruvian group El Polen.

Restoration  
Andrea Franco Batievsky, the director's granddaughter, oversaw the restoration process of  Cholo  and  Mirage  at the UCLA Film & Television Archive.

References

1972 films
1972 drama films
Peruvian drama films
Peruvian sports films
Films about sportspeople
Films about racism
1970s Peruvian films
1970s Spanish-language films